Irish Canyon is a valley in Moffat County in northwestern Colorado at 6,099 feet [CONVERT?] in elevation according to United States Geological Survey (USGS). The Bureau of Land Management states that the elevations rise from 6,100 to 8,636 feet. It is a scenic canyon and somewhat remote. It is designated both as the Irish Canyon Natural Area and Irish Canyon Area of Critical Environmental Concern.

Designated areas
Designated a natural area, it is owned by the Bureau of Land Management and the State Land Board. Irish Canyon Natural Area is significant for its geology and plant communities. It is also designated an Area of Critical Environmental Concern (ACEC) due to its plant species, unique geology, scenery, and cultural resources. The eastern end of Uinta Mountains have 22 geological formations, 12 of which can be found in Irish Canyon. There are steep canyon walls, no more than 50 yards wide, with green, gray and red layers.

History
Petroglyphs, made by prehistoric peoples, are located in the south entrance to the canyon, where there is a short hiking trail. An interpretive exhibit explains the petroglyphs. There are other unmarked archaeological and cultural sites in the canyon. Browns Park was a place of refuge for outlaws like Butch Cassidy, Isom Dart, Matt Warner at the turn of the 20th century.

Camping and hiking
There are no developed trails, but there hiking is available at Cold Spring Mountain and Limestone Ridge to the west and the badlands along Vermillion Creek and Vermillion Canyon. There are mountain biking areas at Cold Spring Mountain and other areas in the region. Six camping sites, with fire pits and a pit toilet are located at the north area of the canyon.

References

Landforms of Moffat County, Colorado
Protected areas of Moffat County, Colorado